Michael I  may refer to:

 Pope Michael I of Alexandria, Coptic Pope of Alexandria and Patriarch of the See of St. Mark in 743–767
 Michael I Rhangabes, Byzantine Emperor (died in 844)
 Michael I Cerularius, Patriarch Michael I of Constantinople (c. 1000–1059)
 Michael I of Duklja, Prince and King of Duklja and (d. 1081)
 Mikhail of Vladimir (died in 1176)
 Michael I Komnenos Doukas (died in 1215)
 Michael I of Russia (1596–1645)
 Michael I of Poland (Michał Korybut Wiśniowiecki), King of Poland and Grand Duke of Lithuania (1640-1673)
 Michael of Portugal (1802–1866)
 Michael I of Serbia (1823–1868)
 Michael Cseszneky de Milvany, Michael I of Macedonia (1910–1975)
 Michael I of Romania (1921–2017)
 Michael I, regnal name of conclavist antipope David Bawden (born 1959)

See also
 Michael (disambiguation)